Neal Skupski (born 1 December 1989) is a British professional tennis player who specialises in doubles. He achieved his career-high doubles ranking of world No. 1 on 14 November 2022.

He is a two-time Grand Slam champion in mixed doubles, having won the 2021 and 2022 Wimbledon Championships alongside Desirae Krawczyk. Skupski has won 13 titles on the ATP Tour, including the 2022 Madrid Open, 2022 Canadian Open and the 2022 Paris Masters with partner Wesley Koolhof. He has finished runner-up at the US Open and four further Masters 1000 events. He also reached the men's doubles semifinals at the 2019 US Open with Jamie Murray, and has reached the quarterfinals or better at all four major tournaments.

He is the younger brother of former tennis player Ken Skupski, and the pair regularly competed together until 2021, most notably winning the 2021 Mexican Open. Skupski has represented Great Britain in the Davis Cup since 2019, and competed at the 2020 Summer Olympics.



Early life and professional career
Skupski was born in Liverpool and went to King David High School. His father, Ken Sr. of Polish descent, is a retired police officer, his mother Mary is a golfer. Neal is the younger brother of Ken Skupski Jr., with whom he has regularly partnered since 2013. He competed in a handful of matches in 2010 and 2011, before taking a year out to finish his degree at Louisiana State University, where he studied sports administration as well as playing college tennis, before turning professional in 2013.

2013: ATP debut, first ATP final, top 100 debut
He began competing as a professional in 2013, initially playing on the Futures and Challenger Tours. After playing with a number of partners, he started competing more frequently with his brother Ken from March 2013 onwards. The pair reached the final of the Nottingham Trophy on the Challenger Tour, before winning five Challenger titles in 2013, as of 23 September. These wins saw Neal move into the world top 200 in July 2013. 

At the 2013 Kremlin Cup the Skupski brothers entered their first ATP World Tour tournament, progressing to the final, where they lost on a tie-break. Following the final, Neal moved into the top 100 for the first time, having been unranked at the start of the season. He ended 2013 ranked 86th in the world.

2017–2018: First Grand Slam quarterfinal, first two ATP titles
At the 2017 Wimbledon Championships he reached the quarterfinals as a wildcard for the first time in his career partnering with his brother Ken where they were defeated by 4th seeded pair Łukasz Kubot and Marcelo Melo.

Skupski won his first ATP Tour title at the Open Sud de France, partnering again with his brother Ken, their first ATP title together. He won his second and biggest title of his career thus far at the ATP 500 2018 Vienna Open partnering with fellow Brit Joe Salisbury.

2019–2020: First Major mixed-doubles & doubles semifinals and Masters final
Skupski and Spanish partner María José Martínez Sánchez were defeated in their mixed doubles semifinal at the 2019 Australian Open by third seeded pair and eventual champions Barbora Krejčíková and Rajeev Ram.

Following the 2019 French Open, Skupski formed a partnership with fellow Briton Jamie Murray. With Murray he reached his first Grand Slam semifinal at the 2019 US Open (tennis) where they lost to the top-seeded Colombian pair and eventual champions Juan Sebastián Cabal and Robert Farah.

He made his first Masters 1000 final at the 2020 Western & Southern Open defeating top seeded pair Cabal/Farah in the first round en-route before losing to Pablo Carreno Busta and Alex de Minaur in the final, and won his fourth ATP doubles title at the 2020 Sofia Open by a walkover from Jürgen Melzer and Édouard Roger-Vasselin.

The pair Skupski/Murray also reached the quarterfinals at the French Open, which was Neal’s first showing at this level at this Major and third overall and again the quarterfinals at the US Open.

2021: Top 15 debut and Wimbledon mixed-doubles champion, Olympics debut
In March, Skupski won his fifth ATP title with his brother Ken at the Mexican Open.
Two weeks later, he reached his second Masters-1000 final with compatriot Dan Evans at the Miami Open and entered the top 20 in the doubles rankings for the first time. Again two weeks later and partnering with Dan Evans, he reached his third Masters 1000 final at the Monte-Carlo Masters and climbed to a career-high ranking in doubles of world No. 16 on 19 April 2021. On 11 July 2021, partnering with Desirae Krawczyk, he won the Wimbledon mixed-doubles final. He reached the top 15 in doubles on 12 July 2021.

At the 2021 San Diego Open Skupski won his sixth title and second of the season partnering Joe Salisbury.

2022: Partnership with Koolhof, Four ATP & Three Masters & mixed doubles titles, World No. 1
Partnering with Wesley Koolhof he won two ATP 250 titles during the Australian Summer swing, before the 2022 Australian Open. The pair reached the quarterfinals at the first Grand Slam of the year for the first time at this Major. They won their third title at the 2022 Qatar ExxonMobil Open dropping only one set en route to the final where they defeated Rohan Bopanna and Denis Shapovalov in straight sets. He reached the final of the 2022 Miami Open with Koolhof where they lost to John Isner and Hubert Hurkacz.

Seeded seventh, they reached their second Masters 1000 final at the 2022 Mutua Madrid Open after defeating John Isner and Hubert Hurkacz. In the final they defeated fifth seeds Robert Farah and Juan Sebastián Cabal to win their first Masters 1000 title in their career and as a pair.

At the 2022 French Open he reached the quarterfinals with Koolhof for the second time at this Major, defeating unseeded pair of Americans Tommy Paul and Mackenzie McDonald. As a result Skupski entered the top 10 of the ATP rankings in doubles for the first time on 6 June 2022.

At the 2022 Wimbledon Championships he successfully defended and won his second Major title in mixed doubles again partnering Desirae Krawczyk. They defeated Matthew Ebden and Samantha Stosur in straight sets. He reached the top 5 in the doubles rankings on 18 July 2022.

At the 2022 National Bank Open he reached with Koolhof the semifinals of a Masters 1000 for the third time in the season defeating Lloyd Glasspool/Harri Heliövaara. Next the pair advanced to the eight final of the season defeating Krawietz/Mies. They won their sixth title defeating Dan Evans and John Peers. As a result he moved to world No. 4 in the doubles rankings on 15 August 2022 and to No. 3 on 22 August 2022.

Seeded 2nd at the US Open the pair reached the quarterfinals defeating Wimbledon champions Australian pair of Ebden/Purcell in three sets. Next they defeated Marcelo Demoliner and Joao Sousa to reach the semifinals. In the semifinals, they defeated Marcelo Arevalo and Jean-Julien Rojer. In the finals, they lost in straight sets to Rajeev Ram and Joe Salisbury. At the 2022 Rolex Paris Masters the pair Koolhof/Skupski reached the semifinals defeating ninth seeds Rohan Bopanna/Matwe Middelkoop climbing to World No. 1 and World No. 2 and solidifying the No. 1 position as a pair in the doubles race. They reached their 10th final and fourth at a Masters level for the season defeating seventh seeds Lloyd Glasspool /Harri Heliövaara. They won their third Masters title and seventh title for the season defeating eight seeds Ivan Dodig/Austin Krajicek in the final. They also clinched the No. 1 year-end ranking as a team. Skupski became joint world No. 1 with Koolhof in doubles on 14 November 2022.

World TeamTennis
Skupski has played five seasons with World TeamTennis starting in 2015 when he made his league debut with the California Dream. He has since played four seasons (2016-2019) for the New York Empire. Skupski was a part of the New York Empire, who claimed the King Trophy during 2020 WTT season at The Greenbrier.

Significant finals

Grand Slam tournament finals

Doubles: 1 (1 runner-up)

Mixed doubles: 2 (2 titles)

Masters 1000 finals

Doubles: 8 (3 titles, 5 runner-ups)

ATP career finals

Doubles: 28 (13 titles, 15 runner-ups)

ATP Challenger and ITF Futures finals

Doubles: 44 (30 titles, 14 runners-up)

Doubles performance timeline

Current through the 2022 Paris Masters.

References

External links
 
 

1989 births
Living people
People educated at King David High School, Liverpool
English expatriate sportspeople in the United States
English people of Polish descent
English male tennis players
LSU Tigers tennis players
British male tennis players
Tennis people from Merseyside
Sportspeople from Liverpool
Wimbledon champions
Grand Slam (tennis) champions in mixed doubles
Tennis players at the 2020 Summer Olympics
Olympic tennis players of Great Britain
ATP number 1 ranked doubles tennis players